Mark Saunders  (born 1962) is a retired Canadian police officer who served as chief of police with the Toronto Police Service (TPS) from April 26, 2015 to July 31, 2020.

Early life and education
Saunders was born in England to Jamaican parents. His family moved from England to Quebec in 1967, and in 1969, they settled in Milton, Ontario. He was student council president while attending Milton District High School, and also attended W. I. Dick Middle School, J.M. Denyes School, and Martin Street Middle School. He earned an honours bachelor of applied science in justice studies from the University of Guelph-Humber.

Toronto Police Service
Saunders began his policing career after graduating from high school. Before being appointed chief in 2015, he held the position of deputy chief in charge of specialized operations command. He has had assignments with professional standards, urban street gang unit, intelligence division, drug squad, community safety command, and emergency task force, and served as the unit commander of the homicide squad.

Chief of police 

Saunders was selected by the Toronto Police Services Board on April 17, 2015, to succeed Bill Blair as the chief of police. Saunders is the first Black Canadian to lead the Toronto police and the second Black Canadian to lead a police force in Canada (having been preceded by Devon Clunis of the Winnipeg Police Service in 2012). 

In August 2019, the Toronto Police Services Board extended Saunders' five year contract by one year, until April 2021. However, on June 8, 2020, Saunders announced his retirement effective July 31, 2020

Toronto van attack 
The Toronto van attack was a vehicle-ramming attack that occurred on April 23, 2018, when a rented van was driven along Yonge Street through the North York City Centre business district in Toronto, Ontario. The driver targeted pedestrians, killing 10 and injuring 16, some critically. The incident is the deadliest vehicle-ramming attack in Canadian history.

Danforth shooting 
The 2018 Toronto shooting, known locally as the Danforth shooting, was a mass shooting that occurred on Danforth Avenue in the Greektown neighbourhood of Toronto, Ontario, on the night of July 22 which killed two people and wounded thirteen. The shooter died by suicide after a shootout with TPS officers.

2010–2017 Toronto serial homicides 

Between 2010 and 2017, a series of men disappeared in Toronto, Ontario, Canada. In the early part of the decade, Toronto police had created Project Houston, a divisional task force which linked the disappearance of three men of South Asian or Middle Eastern origin to Church and Wellesley, Toronto's gay village. The investigation was unable to determine if the disappearances were related or if a crime had been committed. In mid-2017, amid public speculation of a serial killer in Church and Wellesley, evidence was gained from another missing-persons investigation which led TPS to create a second divisional task force, Project Prism. In January 2018, Project Prism investigators obtained evidence connecting two disappearances to Bruce McArthur, a 66-year-old self-employed landscaper, whom they arrested on January 18, 2018.

Resignation 
Saunders announced his resignation on June 8, 2020, after serving 37 years with TPS. July 31, 2020 was his final day as chief – 8 months prior to the expiry of Saunders' contract. Saunders said he made the decision to leave sooner in order to "put family first".

Post-policing career 
In December 2020, Saunders joined the COVID-19 vaccine task-force for Ontario during the COVID-19 pandemic in Ontario. He was named the province's special advisor for the Ontario Place redevelopment project.

2022 provincial election 
Saunders unsuccessfully contested the 2022 Ontario general election as the Progressive Conservative candidate for the riding of Don Valley West, previously held by former premier Kathleen Wynne since 2003, who was not seeking re-election. He was defeated by the Liberal candidate, accountant Stephanie Bowman.

Personal life
Saunders has four children with his wife Stacey; they live in Etobicoke.

In October 2017, Saunders had a kidney transplant surgery with his wife as the donor. Saunders was born with only one kidney and underwent nightly kidney dialysis at home for 15 months prior to the surgery. He stated that the family went public about the transplant in order to raise awareness of the organ donation program.

Honours

References

External links

 The Governor General of Canada > Honours > Find a Recipient > Mark Saunders
 Mark Saunders' biography at Toronto Police Service

Toronto police chiefs
Living people
People from Milton, Ontario
Canadian people of Jamaican descent
English emigrants to Canada
1962 births
University of Guelph alumni
Black Canadian people
English people of Jamaican descent
People from London